Hoplojana politzari is a moth in the family Eupterotidae. It was described by Patrick Basquin in 2013. It is found in Somalia.

References

Janinae
Moths described in 2013